Transvestism is the practice of dressing in a manner traditionally or stereotypically associated with a different gender. In some cultures, transvestism is practiced for religious, traditional, or ceremonial reasons. The term is considered outdated in Western cultures, especially when used to describe a transgender or gender-fluid person.

History

Though the term was coined as late as the 1910s by Magnus Hirschfeld, the phenomenon is not new. It was referred to in the Hebrew Bible. Being part of the homosexual movement of Weimar Germany in the beginning, a first transvestite movement of its own started to form since the mid-1920s, resulting in founding first organizations and the first transvestite magazine, Das 3. Geschlecht. The rise of Nazism stopped this movement from 1933 onwards.

Terminology
The word has undergone several changes of meaning since it was first coined and is still used in a variety of senses. Today, the term transvestite is commonly considered outdated and derogatory, with the term cross-dresser used as a more appropriate replacement. This is because the term transvestite was historically used to diagnose medical disorders, including mental health disorders, and transvestism was viewed as a disorder, but the term cross-dresser was coined by the transgender community. In some cases, however, the term transvestite is seen as more appropriate for use by members of the transgender community instead of by those outside of the transgender community, and some have reclaimed the word.

Etymology
Magnus Hirschfeld coined the word transvestite in 1910 (from Latin trans-, "across, over" and vestitus, "dressed") to refer to the sexual interest in cross-dressing. He used it to describe persons who habitually and voluntarily wore clothes of the opposite sex. Hirschfeld's group of transvestites consisted of both males and females, with heterosexual, homosexual, bisexual, and asexual orientations.

Hirschfeld himself was not happy with the term: He believed that clothing was only an outward symbol chosen on the basis of various internal psychological situations. In fact, Hirschfeld helped people to achieve the first name changes (legal given names were required to be gender-specific in Germany) and performed the first reported sexual reassignment surgery. Hirschfeld's transvestites therefore were, in today's terms, not only transvestites, but a variety of people from the transgender spectrum.

Hirschfeld also noticed that sexual arousal was often associated with transvestism. In more recent terminology, this is sometimes called transvestic fetishism. Hirschfeld also clearly distinguished between transvestism as an expression of a person's "contra-sexual" (transgender) feelings and fetishistic behavior, even if the latter involved wearing clothes of the other sex.

Cross-dressers

One of the fiercest activists to come out of the Stonewall Riots was Sylvia Rivera, who set up Street Transvestite Action Revolutionaries. In a 1971 essay, "Transvestites: Your Half Sisters and Half Brothers of the Revolution", Rivera wrote, "Transvestites are homosexual men and women who dress in clothes of the opposite sex."

After all the changes that took place during the 1970s, a large group was left without a word to describe themselves: heterosexual males who wear traditionally feminine clothing. This group was not particularly happy with the term "transvestism", and therefore took on the term "cross-dresser". Cross-dressers are men who wear female clothing and often both admire and imitate women, but self-identify as different from both gay men and transsexuals, and generally deny having fetishistic intentions.

When cross-dressing occurs for erotic purposes over a period of at least six months and also causes significant distress or impairment, the behavior is considered a mental disorder in the Diagnostic and Statistical Manual of Mental Disorders, and the psychiatric diagnosis "transvestic fetishism" is applied.

Culture
In some cultures, transvestism is practiced for religious, traditional or ceremonial reasons. For example, in India some male devotees of the Hindu god Krishna, especially in Mathura and Vrindavan, dress in female attire to pose as his consort, the goddess Radha, as an act of devotion. In Italy, the Neapolitan femminielli wear wedding dresses, called the matrimonio dei femminielli (marriage of the feminine males), a procession takes place through the streets, a tradition that apparently has pagan origins.

Image gallery

See also
Cross-dressing
Drag (clothing)
Dual-role transvestism
Gender bender
List of transgender-related topics
Transsexual
Travesti (theatre)

Notes

References
 Ackroyd, Peter. Dressing up, transvestism and drag: the history of an obsession. Simon and Schuster, 1979. 
 Mancini, Elena. A Brighter Shade of Pink: Magnus Hirschfeld. ProQuest, 2007. 
 Ambrosio, Giovanna. Transvestism, Transsexualism in the Psychoanalytic Dimension. Karnac Books, 2011. 
 Gravois, Valory. Cherry Single: A Transvestite Comes of Age (a novel) Alchemist/Light Publishing, 1997 (Available to read free, online),

Further reading

External links

Transvestism at Britannica Online Encyclopædia

 Transvestism
Clothing
Gender nonconformity
Transgender